Jesse Whiteway (1863 – 1940) was a merchant and politician in Newfoundland. He represented Bay de Verde in the Newfoundland House of Assembly from 1908 to 1913 as a member of the People's Party.

The son of Robert Whiteway, he was born in Musgrave Harbour and was educated at the Wesleyan Academy in St. John's. Whiteway married Mary E. Strange. He began work with a dry goods firm as a teenager and, in 1886, went into business in partnership with a brother. With his sons, he opened his own business in 1918.

He was elected to the Newfoundland assembly in 1908, re-elected in 1909 but defeated when he ran for re-election in 1913. He was named to the Legislative Council of Newfoundland in 1919 but resigned later that same year to run unsuccessfully for the Bay de Verde seat in the assembly. Whiteway also served on the board of governors for the General Hospital.

References 

1863 births
1940 deaths
Newfoundland People's Party MHAs
Members of the Legislative Council of Newfoundland
Dominion of Newfoundland politicians